The 1998 WNBA season was the second season for the Houston Comets. The Comets won their second straight championship.  Their record of 27-3 remains the best in league history.

WNBA Draft

Regular season

Season standings

Season Schedule

Playoffs

Awards and honors
 Cynthia Cooper, WNBA Finals MVP Award
 Cynthia Cooper, WNBA Most Valuable Player Award
Cynthia Cooper, Best WNBA Player ESPY Award
 Van Chancellor, WNBA Coach of the Year Award

References

External links 
 Comets on Basketball Reference
 

Houston Comets seasons
Houston
Houston
Women's National Basketball Association championship seasons
Western Conference (WNBA) championship seasons